Tony Toklomety (born 3 March 1984 in Cotonou) is a Beninese football player.

Career
Toklomety previously played for Maccabi Netanya F.C., Postel Sport and MŠK Žilina.
Tokolomety was accused of faking his year of birth on his passport by the Israeli media, a claim that was never proving to be true. In result of these publications, Netanya decided to release him from his contract. Tony's son Idan Toklomety Gorno is also a footballer, he was born in Israel and plays now for Maccabi Petah Tikva and the Israel national under-19 football team. In 2018 a documentary movie titled Toklomati was released on what happened to Tony while playing in Israel, while now being on a journey to Israel in order to become an Israeli citizen to live next to his Israeli born son. The movie got accepted in the Jerusalem Film Festival and the Chicago International Film Festival.

International career
He was part of the Beninese 2004 African Nations Cup team, who finished bottom of their group in the first round of competition, thus failing to secure qualification for the quarter-finals.

Honours
 Slovak Super Liga
 Winner (1): 2006–07
 Nigerian Premier League
 Winner (1): 2009-10

References

External links

1984 births
Living people
Beninese footballers
Benin international footballers
Beninese expatriate footballers
2004 African Cup of Nations players
Maccabi Netanya F.C. players
MŠK Žilina players
Slovak Super Liga players
Expatriate footballers in Israel
Expatriate footballers in Slovakia
People from Cotonou
Expatriate footballers in Nigeria
Enyimba F.C. players
Beninese expatriate sportspeople in Nigeria
Association football defenders